The Rotters is a 1921 British silent comedy film directed by A. V. Bramble and starring Joe Nightingale, Sydney Fairbrother and Sidney Paxton. It was based on a play by H. F. Maltby.

Plot
A headmistress recognises a married JP as her ex-lover and stops him from sentencing the Mayor's son.

Cast
 Joe Nightingale - Joe Barnes 
 Sydney Fairbrother - Jemima Nivet 
 Sidney Paxton - John Clugson MP 
 Margery Meadows - Estelle Clugson 
 Roger Tréville - Percy Clugson 
 Ernest English - John Wait 
 Cynthia Murtagh - Margaret Barnes 
 Clare Greet - Mrs Clugson 
 Stanley Holloway - Arthur Wait 
 Margaret Shelley - Winnie Clugson

References

External links

1921 films
British silent feature films
British comedy films
British films based on plays
Films directed by A. V. Bramble
Ideal Film Company films
British black-and-white films
1921 comedy films
1920s English-language films
1920s British films
Silent comedy films